The Space Solar Telescope (SST) is a planned Chinese optical space solar telescope. It was first proposed in the 1990s, and is intended to be a  telescope.

See also
 List of solar telescopes

References

Telescopes
Chinese telescopes
Solar telescopes
Proposed satellites
Satellites of China